TGS ASA (TGS), formerly TGS NOPEC Geophysical Company ASA  is an energy data and analytics company. It gathers, interprets, and markets seismic and geophysical data regarding subsurface terrains worldwide in order to evaluate oil and gas formations for drilling operations.  TGS is listed on the Oslo Stock Exchange, was founded by a 1998 merger of TGS (Tomlinson Geophysical Services Inc.), Calibre Geophysical Co. Inc (founded 1981), and NOPEC (Norwegian Petroleum Exploration Consultants) International ASA founded in 1981, with financial headquarters in Oslo, Norway and operational headquarters in Houston, Texas.

The Company is led by CEO Kristian Johansen with nearly 500 employees around the globe with main offices located in Oslo, Houston, London, and Perth.

See also

 List of Norwegian companies

Engineering companies of Norway
Oil companies of Norway
Companies based in Asker
Non-renewable resource companies established in 1981
1981 establishments in Norway
Companies listed on the Oslo Stock Exchange